The Apple Scrapple Festival is held annually during the second weekend in October in Bridgeville, Delaware.  It was first held in 1992.

Notable events include the Ladies' Iron Skillet Toss, the Scrapple Chunkin' Contest, and the Mayor's Scrapple Sling.  The name of the festival is derived from two agricultural products which are important to this region, apples and Scrapple.  The Apple Scrapple Festival was named one of the top 100 events in North America by the American Bus Association.

Since there'll be no festival in 2020 caused by the COVID-19 pandemic, the 29th was deferred to 2021.

References

External links

Tourist attractions in Sussex County, Delaware
Festivals in Delaware
Food and drink festivals in the United States
Apple festivals